Lutheran Brethren Seminary (LBS) is an institute of theological higher education of the Church of the Lutheran Brethren of America (CLBA), located in Fergus Falls, Minnesota.  It shares its campus with the denominational headquarters of the CLBA and the denomination’s high school, Hillcrest Lutheran Academy.  The seminary’s primary mission is to train and equip pastors, missionaries, and Christian lay workers for ministry in the Church of the Lutheran Brethren and other church bodies.

History

The academic institution that would become known as Lutheran Brethren Seminary was founded in Wahpeton, North Dakota, in 1903 as “Lutheran Bible School.”  It began as an institute for the training of Lutheran Brethren pastors and young laypeople wishing to receive a solid Biblical education.  The pastor’s training course would eventually become the Seminary department, and the lay Bible course would become the Bible School department.  In 1916, a four-year high school department was added to Lutheran Bible School.

The school was first relocated in 1918 to Grand Forks, North Dakota, and then again to Fergus Falls, Minnesota in 1935, on the campus of the former Park Region Luther College.  In 1946, the Seminary and Bible School departments moved across town to the former Northwestern College campus in Fergus Falls, leaving the high school to remain by itself on the Park Region campus. The school system was renamed “Lutheran Brethren Schools” in 1948, and the high school became known as “Hillcrest Lutheran Academy.”  In 1956, after ten years on a separate campus, the Seminary and Bible School returned to the old Park Region campus, reuniting with Hillcrest.

With increased enrollment in all three departments of the school, it became necessary to implement a building program on the campus. In 1968, Sletta-Strom Memorial Hall was erected as a new dormitory for Bible School and Seminary students.  The Broen Media Center, which now houses Lutheran Brethren Seminary, was completed in 1975, containing four classrooms, a library, and faculty offices.  Also by 1975, the Bible School had become known as Lutheran Brethren Junior Bible College, offering an Associate of Arts degree in Bible.

The 1980s saw a rapid decline in enrollment in the Bible College, which eventually shrunk into a one-year Bible program known as “Alpha Way.”  In 1992, the name of the Bible College was changed to the “Lutheran Center for Christian Learning” (LCCL).  A major change for the schools occurred in 2003, when it was decided to split Hillcrest Lutheran Academy from Lutheran Brethren Schools and incorporate it as a separate school with its own president and board, while still remaining within the Church of the Lutheran Brethren.  In 2004, the Lutheran Center for Christian Learning ceased to exist as a separate entity, and its program became part of the Seminary curriculum as an extension service.  The LCCL eventually dissolved completely, and “Lutheran Brethren Schools” became an obsolete title.

In 2012, Lutheran Brethren Seminary was awarded Accredited status through the Transnational Association of Christian Colleges and Schools (TRACS) as a Category III institution. In 2013 the TRACS Accreditation Commission approved the Seminary’s substantive change request to offer its accredited programs via distance learning technology.

The seminary was granted an exception to Title IX in 2018 which allows it to legally discriminate against LGBT students for religious reasons. It is ranked among the "Absolute Worst Campuses for LGBTQ Youth" by Campus Pride.

Presidents of LBS

Academic programs

Master of Divinity (M.Div.)
Master of Theological Studies (M.T.S)
Diploma in Christian Ministry
Certificate of Theological Studies
Lay Ministry
Bible and Theology
Missions
Youth Ministry

References

External links

Lutheran seminaries
Seminaries and theological colleges in Minnesota
Education in Otter Tail County, Minnesota
Fergus Falls, Minnesota
Seminary
Grand Forks, North Dakota